Solodke is a village in Volnovakha Raion (district) in Donetsk Oblast of eastern Ukraine, at about  southwest by west from the centre of Donetsk city. It belongs to Vuhledar urban hromada, one of the hromadas of Ukraine.

References

Villages in Volnovakha Raion